Oreini ( meaning "mountainous", before 1928: Μποστενίτσα - Bostenitsa) is a mountain village and a community in the municipal unit of Lampeia, Elis, Greece. Oreini is built on the slopes of Mount Lampeia, part of the Erymanthos range. The community Oreini consists of the villages Oreini and Paliofytia. The population in 2011 was 194 for the village and 206 for the community. Oreini is located 4 km east of Lampeia, 4 km west of Psofida, 6 km south of Agrampela and 32 km northeast of Olympia. The former name of the village, Bostenitsa, suggests a Slavic origin. The revolutionary leader Theodoros Papasimakopoulos, who fought in the Greek War of Independence, was from Bostenitsa.

Gallery

See also

List of settlements in Elis

References

External links

 Oreini GTP Travel Pages

Populated places in Elis